Ruth Scurr, Lady Stothard FRSL is a British writer, historian and literary critic. She is a Fellow of Gonville and Caius College, Cambridge.

She was educated at St Bernard's Convent, Slough; Oxford University, Cambridge University and the Ecole Normale Supérieure, Paris. She won a British Academy Postdoctoral Fellowship in 2000.

Works

Her first book, Fatal Purity: Robespierre and the French Revolution (Chatto & Windus, 2006; Metropolitan Books, 2006), won the Franco-British Society Literary Prize (2006), was shortlisted for the Duff Cooper Prize (2006), long-listed for the Samuel Johnson Prize (2007) and was listed among the 100 Best Books of the Decade in The Times in 2009. It has been translated into five languages.

Her second book, John Aubrey: My Own Life (Chatto & Windus, 2015; New York Review of Books, 2016), was shortlisted for the 2015 Costa Biography Award and the James Tait Black Memorial Prize.

Her third book, Napoleon: A Life in Gardens and Shadows (Chatto & Windus, 2021; Norton, 2021), was published to critical acclaim on both sides of the Atlantic to mark the 200th anniversary of Napoleon's death.

Career

Scurr began reviewing regularly for The Times and The Times Literary Supplement in 1997. Since then she has also written for The Daily Telegraph, The Observer, New Statesman, The London Review of Books, The New York Review of Books, The Nation, The New York Observer, The Guardian and The Wall Street Journal. She was a consultant editor at The Times Literary Supplement from 2015 to 2020.

She was a judge on the Man Booker Prize panel in 2007, and the Samuel Johnson Prize panel in 2014. She is a member of the Folio Prize Academy.

Scurr is Director of Studies in Human, Social and Political Sciences for Gonville and Caius College, Cambridge, where she has been a Fellow since 2006. Her research interests include: 17th- and 18th-century history of ideas; biographical, autobiographical and life writing; the British and French Enlightenments; the French Revolution; Revolutionary Memoir; early Feminist Political Thought; and contemporary fiction in English.

Bibliography

Books

Dissertations, theses

Critical studies and reviews
 Review of John Aubrey.

See also
 Maximilien Robespierre
 2015 in literature

References

External links
 Official website
 Hilary Mantel, "If you'd seen his green eyes", London Review of Books, Vol. 28, No. 8, 20 April 2006. Accessed 19 December 2022.
 Rebecca Abrams, "Review: The monstrous puzzle of the revolution", The Guardian, 20 May 2006. Accessed 19 December 2022.
 Jeremy Robb, "Sea-green Robespierre, mad as a fish, The Telegraph, 9 May 2006. Accessed 19 December 2022.
 Munro Price, "Making the monster human" (review of Fatal Purity''), Telegraph.co.uk, 14 May 2006. Accessed 19 December 2022.

Living people
British biographers
British historians
British literary critics
British women historians
British women literary critics
Fellows of Gonville and Caius College, Cambridge
Fellows of the Royal Society of Literature
Wives of knights
Year of birth missing (living people)